The 2010 Chicago Red Stars season was the second season of the soccer club and its second season in the Women's Professional Soccer league.

Major events

Team news
For the 2010 season the Red Stars returned nine of their original 22 players from 2009.

After the 2010 season, the Red Stars could not come up with the security bond for Women's Professional Soccer. On December 13, 2010, the Red Stars informed its fans that they would not be able to return for the 2011 WPS season.

Squad

First-team squad

As of July 30, 2010.

Transfers

In

Out

Club

Management

Emma Hayes started the season as the head coach, but she was fired on May 10. Marcia McDermott served in the position on an interim basis, during which the team beat the top of the table FC Gold Pride 1-0. Omid Namazi was hired in the beginning of June.

Competitions

Women's Professional Soccer

Standings 
Blue denotes team has clinched regular season championship.
Green denotes team has spot in 2010 Women's Professional Soccer Playoffs.

Results summary 

Games played against the Saint Louis Athletica before they folded still counted toward a team's point total.

Matches

WPS regular season

Statistics

Golden Boot

Source: womensprosoccer.com

Other information

References

American soccer clubs 2010 season
2010
2010 Women's Professional Soccer season
2010 in sports in Illinois